Below is a partial list of selected villages and towns (shtetls) depopulated of Jews during the Holocaust. The liquidation actions were carried out mostly by the Nazi Einsatzgruppen and Order Police battalions as well as auxiliary police through mass killings. The German "pacification" units of the Einsatzkommando were paramilitary forces within the Schutzstaffel, under the high command of the Obergruppenführer. The Einsatzgruppen operated primarily in the years 1941–45.

The towns and villages are listed by country, as follows:

BelarusEstoniaHungaryLatviaLithuaniaPolandRomaniaRussiaSloveniaUkraine

Belarus

Hungary
The following Jewish communities in Hungary were either partially or completely destroyed during the Holocaust.

Latvia
Jewish communities in the following Latvian cities, towns and villages were destroyed during the Holocaust:

 Aglona
 Aizpute
 Aknīste 
 Alūksne 
 Ape
 Auce
 Babīte 
 Baldone
 Baltinava 
 Balvi
 Bauska
 Carnikava
 Cibla
 Dagda
 Daugavpils
 Dobele
 Dundaga
 Engure
 Grobiņa
 Gulbene
 Ilūkste
 Jaunjelgava
 Jēkabpils
 Jelgava
 Jūrmala
 Kandava
 Kārsava
 Koknese
 Krāslava
 Krustpils
 Kuldīga
 Liepāja
 Limbaži
 Līvāni
 Ludza
 Madona
 Nereta
 Ogre
 Pārgauja
 Pāvilosta
 Pļaviņas
 Preiļi
 Priekuļi
 Rēzekne
 Riebiņi
 Riga
 Roja
 Rucava
 Rugāji
 Rūjiena
 Salaspils
 Saldus
 Skrunda
 Smiltene
 Strenči
 Talsi
 Tukums
 Vaiņode
 Valka
 Valmiera
 Varakļāni
 Ventspils
 Viesīte
 Viļaka
 Zilupe

Lithuania
The following Jewish communities in Lithuania were destroyed during the Holocaust. Note that the list includes places in modern, post-1991 Lithuania, some of which were in German-occupied Poland during the war.

Adutiškis (Haydutsetshik)
Akmenė (Akmyan)
Alanta (Avante, Alunte)
Aleksotas (Aleksot)
Alsėdžiai (Alsad)
Alytus (Alíte)
Antalieptė (Antalept)
Anykščiai (Aniksht, Aniks)
Ariogala (Ragole, Eyragole)
Aukštadvaris (Visokedvor)
Ąžuolų Būda (Bude)
Babtai (Bobt)
Bagaslaviškis (Bogoslavishok)
Baisogala (Beysegole)
Balbieriškis (Balbireshok)
Balninkai (Bolnik)
Batakiai (Batok)
Bazilionys (Bazilyan, Padubysys)
Betygala (Betigole)
Bezdonys (Bezdan)
Birštonas (Birshtan)
Biržai (Birzh)
Butrimonys (Butrimants)
Čekiškė (Tsaykishok)
Čekoniškės (Tsekhanovik)
Darbėnai (Drobyan)
Darsūniškis (Darshunishok)
Daugai (Doyg)
Daugailiai (Dagel)
Debeikiai (Dabeyk)
Dieveniškės (Divenishok)
Dotnuva (Datneve)
Druskininkai (Drusgenik)
Dubingiai (Dubinik)
Dūkštas (Duksht)
Dusetos (Dusat)
Eišiškės (Eyshishok)
Eržvilkas (Erzvilik)
Gargždai (Gorzd)
Garliava (Gudleve, Garleve)
Gaurė (Gavre)
Gaveikėnai (Gaviken)
Gelvonai (Gelvan)
Giedraičiai (Gedrevits)
Girkalnis (Girtegole)
Grinkiškis (Grinkishok)
Griškabūdis (Grishkabud)
Gruzdžiai (Gruzd)
Gudeliai (Gudel)
Ignalina (Ignaline)
Inturkė (Inturik)
Jašiūnai (Yasun)
Jieznas (Yezne)
Jonava (Yaneve)
Joniškėlis (Yonishkel)
Joniškis (Yanishok)
Josvainiai (Yasven)
Jurbarkas (Yurberik, Yurburg)
Kaišiadorys (Koshedar)
Kaltanėnai (Koltnyan), near Tauragė
Kaltinėnai (Koltnyan), near Švenčionys
Kalvarija (Kalvarye)
Kamajai (Kamay)
Kapčiamiestis (Koptsheve)
Karklėnai (Karklan)
Kaunas (Kovne)
Kavarskas (Kovarsk)
Kazlų Rūda (Kazloverude)
Kėdainiai (Keydan)
Kelmė (Kelm)
Kiduliai (Kidl)
Klaipėda (Meml)
Klykoliai (Klikol)
Krakės (Krok)
Kražiai (Krozh)
Krekenava (Krakinove)
Kretinga (Kretinge)
Kriukai (Kruk), in Šiauliai region
Kriukai (Kruk) in Šakiai region
Kruonis (Kron)
Kudirkos Naumiestis (Nayshtot, Nayshtot-Shaki, Nayshtot-Shirvint, Vladivaslov, Dubilaytsh)
Kuktiškės (Kuktishok)
Kuliai (Kul)
Kupiškis (Kupeshok, Slavyansk)
Kurkliai (Kurkl)
Kuršėnai (Kurshan)
Kurtuvėnai (Kurtevyan)
Kvėdarna (Khveydan, Konstantinove)
Kvetkai (Kvetke)
Kybartai (Kibart)
Labanoras (Labonar)
Laižuva (Layzeve)
Latava (Lotove)
Laukuva (Loykeve)
Lazdijai (Lazdey)
Leckava (Latskeve)
Leipalingis (Leypun)
Lentvaris (Landverove)
Linkmenys (Ligmyan)
Linkuva (Linkeve)
Liškiava (Lishkeve)
Liubavas (Lubave)
Liudvinavas (Ludvinove; Trob)
Luokė (Luknik)
Lyduvėnai (Lidevyan)
Lygumai (Ligum, Ligem)
Maišiagala (Meysegole)
Marcinkonys (Martsinkants)
Marijampolė (Marnpol, Maryampol)
Mažeikiai (Mazheyk)
Merkinė (Meritsh)
Mielagėnai (Malagan)
Miroslavas (Mireslav)
Molėtai (Malat)
Mosėdis (Masyad)
Musninkai (Musnik)
Naujamiestis (Nayshtot-Ponevezh)
Naujasis Daugėliškis (Dogalishok)
Nemakščiai (Namoksht)
Nemenčinė (Nementshin)
Nemunaitis (Nemunayts)
Nemunėlio Radviliškis (Nay-Radvilishok)
Nevarėnai (Naveran)
Obeliai (Abel)
Onuškis (Hanusishok), in the Trakai region
Onuškis (Anishok), in the Rokiškis region
Paberžė (Podbereze)
Pabradė (Podbrodzh)
Pagiriai (Pagir)
Pajūris (Payure)
Pakruojis (Pokroy)
Pakuonis (Pakon)
Palanga (Palange)
Palūšė (Palush)
Pamūšis (Pamushe)
Pandėlys (Ponedel)
Panemunė (Panemune)
Panemunėlis (Panemunik)
Panevėžys (Ponevezh)
Papilė (Popilan)
Pasvalys (Posvol)
Pašvitinys (Poshvetin)
Pikeliai (Pikeln)
Pilviškiai (Pilvishok)
Plateliai (Plotl)
Plungė (Plungyan)
Pociūnėliai (Patsinel)
Prienai (Pren)
Pumpėnai (Pumpyan)
Punia (Pun)
Pušalotas (Pushalat)
Radviliškis (Radvilishok)
Raguva (Rogeve)
Ramygala (Remigole)
Raseiniai (Raseyn)
Ratnica (Ratnitse)
Rietavas (Riteve)
Rokiškis (Rakeshok)
Rozalimas (Rozalye)
Rudamina(Rudamin)
Rūdiškės (Rudishok)
Rumšiškės (Rumshishok)
Šakiai (Shaki)
Salakas (Salok)
Salantai (Salant)
Šalčininkai (Soletshnik)
Saldutiškis (Saldutishok)
Šalkenė (Shalkene)
Saločiai (Salat)
Šaukėnai (Shukyan)
Šaukotas (Shakot)
Seda (Syad)
Šeduva (Shadeve)
Seirijai (Serey)
Semeliškės (Semilishok)
Seredžius (Srednik)
Šešuoliai (Sheshvil)
Šėta (Shat)
Šiaudinė (Shodine)
Šiaulėnai (Shavlan)
Šiauliai (Shavl)
Siesikai (Sheshik)
Šilalė (Shilel)
Šilutė (Heydikrug)
Šiluva (Shidleve)
Šimkaičiai (Shimkaytsh)
Simnas (Simne)
Šimonys (Shimants)
Širvintos (Shirvint)
Skapiškis (Skopishok)
Skaudvilė (Shkudvil)
Skiemonys (Shkumyan)
Skuodas (Shkud)
Smilgiai (Smilg)
Stajotiškės (Stayatseshik)
Stakliškės (Stoklishok)
Subačius (Subotsh)
 (Sudarg)
Surviliškis (Survilishok)
Suvainiškis (Suvinishok)
Svėdasai (Shvadotsh)
Švėkšna (Shvekshin)
Švenčionėliai (Svintsyanke, Nay-Svintsyan)
Švenčionys (Svintsyan)
Taujėnai (Tavyan)
Tauragė (Tavrik)
Tauragnai (Toragin)
Telšiai (Telz)
Tirkšliai (Tirkshle)
Trakai (Trok)
Troškūnai (Trashkun)
Tryškiai (Trishik)
Turgeliai (Turgele)
Turmantas (Turmont)
Tverai (Tver)
Tytuvėnai (Tsitevyan)
Ukmerge (Vilkomir)
Upyna (Upine)
Utena (Utyan)
Užpaliai (Ushpol)
Užventis (Uzvent)
Vabalninkas (Abolnik, Vabolnik)
Vaiguva (Vaygeve)
Vainutas (Vaynute)
Valkininkai (Olkenik)
Vandžiogala (Vendzigole)
Varėna (Aran)
Varniai (Vorne)
Vaškai (Vashki, Konstantinove)
Vegeriai (Veger)
Veisiejai (Vishey)
Veiveriai (Veyver)
Veiviržėnai (Varzhan)
Veliuona (Vilon)
Vidiškis (Vidishok)
Viduklė (Vidukele)
Viekšniai (Vekshne)
Viešintos (Vishinte)
Vievis (Vevye)
Vilkaviškis (Vilkovishik)
Vilkija (Vilki)
Vilnius (Vilne)
Virbalis (Virbaln)
Višakio Rūda (Visokerude)
Vištytis (Vishtenits)
Vyžuonos (Vizhun)
Ylakiai (Yelok)
Žagarė (Zager)
Zapyškis (Sapizishok, Panemune)
Zarasai (Nay-Aleksander, Senderke, Ezherene)
Žarėnai (Zharan)
Žasliai (Zosle)
Žeimelis (Zemlin)
Žeimiai (Zeym)
Želva (Zelve, Podzelve)
Žemaičių Naumiestis (Nayshtot-Tavrik, Sugind)
Židikai (Zhidik)
Žiežmariai (Zezmer)

Poland

Baranów Sandomierski
Bardejov (Slovakia, bordering Poland)
Będzin
Bełchatów
Bełżyce
Białobrzegi
Białystok
Bielsk-Podlaski
Bilgoraj
Bircza
Błażowa
Bochnia
Bobowa
Brody
Brzeźnica
Brzozów
Bukowsko
Bychawa
Bytom
Chełm
Chęciny
Chmielnik
Chodel
Ciechanów
Czeladź
Czemierniki
Częstochowa
Czyżew
Dąbrowa Tarnowska
Dąbrowa Górnicza
Dębica
Dorohusk
Dubienka
Dukla
Dynów
Działoszyn
Firlej
Frampol
Frysztak
Gąbin
Garwolin
Głogów Małopolski
Głowaczów
Głowno
Gorlice
Gostynin
Góra Kalwaria
 
Gorzków
Grabowiec
Grodzisk Mazowiecki
Grójec
Horodlo
Hrubieszów
Iłża
Inowłódz
Izbica Lubelska
Iwaniska
Jabłonka
Janów Lubelski
Janów Sokolski
Jarczów
Jarosław
Jasło
Jedwabne
Kamieńsk
Kańczuga
Kielce
Kiernozia
Kleczew
Klimontów
Knyszyn
Kock
Kolbuszowa
Kolno
Kosin
Komarów-Osada
Koprzywnica
Korczyna
Kozienice
Kraków
Krasnobród
Krasnosielc
Krasnystaw
Krosno
Kryłów
Łaszczów
Łańcut
Łask
Lelów
Leżajsk
Łódź
Lomazy
Łomża
Łosice
Lubaczów
Lubartów
Lublin
Majdan Tatarski
Majdan Królewski
Międzyrzec Podlaski
Mielec
Mińsk Mazowiecki
Mława
Modliborzyce
Mstów
Mszczonów
Nałęczów
Niebylec
Nowy Dwór
Nowy Korczyn
Nowy Sącz
Nowy Wiśnicz
Nur
Olkusz
Opatów
Opole Lubelskie
Osjaków
Opoczno
Ostrołęka
Ostrów Mazowiecka
Oświęcim
Ożarów
Pabianice
Parczew
Piaski Luterskie
Pilica
Pilzno
Piotrków Trybunalski
Płock
Połaniec
Przedecz
Przemyśl
Przeworsk
Radom
Radomsko
Radomyśl Wielki
Radziłów
Radzyń Podlaski
Raniżów
Rejowiec
Ropczyce
Różan
Rozwadów
Ruda Opalin
Rymanów
Rzeszów
Sanniki
Sandomierz
Sanok
Sawin
Sędziszów Małopolski
Sejny
Sidra
Siedliszcze
Skryhiczyn
Sławków
Sochocin
Sokołów Małopolski
Sompolno
Sosnowiec
Sosnowica
Staszów
Staw
Strzyżów
Supraśl
Suwałki
Świerże
Szczebrzeszyn
Szczerców
Szczuczyn
Tarnobrzeg
Tarnogród
Tarnów
Tyrawa Wołoska
Tomaszów Lubelski
Tomaszów Mazowiecki
Tomaszowka
Trochenbrod
Trzcianne
Turobin
Tyczyn
Tykocin
Tyszowce
Uchanie
Ulanów
Urzędów
Warsaw
Warka
Warta
Widawa
Wielkie Oczy
Wizna
Włoszczowa
Wojsławice
Wysokie Lubelskie
Wysokie Mazowieckie
Wyszogród
Zabłudów
Żabno
Zakroczym
Zakrzowek
Zolkiewka
Zambrów
Zamość
Zduńska Wola
Zelów
Zgierz
Żmigród Nowy
Żołynia

Romania

Russia

Lyubavichi

Slovenia

Beltinci
Lendava
Murska Sobota

Ukraine

Bar
Bibrka
Belz
Berdychiv
Berehove
Berezhany
Bila Tserkva
Bolekhiv
Boryslav
Borzna
Boiany
Brody
Bratslav
Buchach
Budaniv
Bukachivtsi
Burshtyn
Chernihiv
Chernivtsi
Chernobyl
Chortkiv
Delyatin
Derazhnia
Dolyna
Drohobych
Dunaivtsi
Gorodenka
Halych
Husiatyn
Horodok
Hornostaypil
Ivano-Frankivsk (Stanisławów)
Justingrad
Kalynivka
Kalush
Kamianets-Podilskyi
Khorostkiv
Khotyn
Komsomolske
Kolki
Kolomyia
Korolevo
Kopychintsy
Kosiv
Kovel
Kremenets
Kupel
Kuty
Lityn (Літин)
Letychiv
Liuboml
Lozisht
Lvovo
Lutsk
Lwów
Liubar
Makariv
Medzhybizh
Melnytsia-Podilska
Mikulints
Mukachevo
Murafa
Nadvirna
Nemyriv
Nizhyn
Novohrad-Volynskyi
Olhopil
Olesko
Olyka
Ottynia
Ozeryany
Pavoloch
Pliskov
Podgaytsy
Pidkamin
Pohrebysche
Polonnoye
Pomortsy
Poninka
Pryluky
Probezhna
Rachmastrivka
Rava-Ruska
Rohatyn
Rivne
Rozdol
Rozhniativ
Ruzhyn
Sadagóra
Sambir
Savran
Seletin
Sharhorod
Shchirets
Shepetivka
Shpykiv
Shumskoye
Skala-Podilska (Skala on the River Zbrucz)
Skalat
Skvyra
Slavuta
Snyatyn
Snitkov
Sosnovoye
Stara Syniava
Starokonstinntyniv
Stepan
Storozhynets
Stryi
Sukhostav
Tarashcha
Teofipol
Tetiev
Terebovlya
Tlumach
Tluste
Trostyanets
Trochinbrod
Tuchin
Ulashkovtse
Uman
Uzhhorod
Verkhny Bystryi
Vishnevets
Volochisk
Voynilov
Vyzhnytsia
Yavoriv
Yablanov
Yagelnitsa
Zabolotov
Zalishchyky
Zbarazh
Zhmerynka
Zhovkva
Zhydachiv
Zinkiv
Zlatopol
Zolochiv

See also
 List of shtetls
 Shtetl
 Where Once We Walked

References

Further reading

Aftermath of the Holocaust
Ethnic cleansing in Europe
Villages